Steelman Partners is an American international architecture and interior design firm specializing in entertainment architecture, interior design, lighting design, graphic design, 3D design, and master planning. The firm has designed casinos and integrated resorts around the world.

Staff 
Steelman Partners has 250 employees worldwide including 150 in their Southern Nevada headquarters.

Founding 
Paul Steelman was employed by Wasleski Steelman, the city of Atlantic City, the Golden Nugget, and MGM Mirage companies after graduating from Clemson University in 1977. In 1987, he founded his own firm, Paul Steelman Ltd. Architect. The name of the company is now Steelman Partners, LLP.

Notable Projects 
 Casino Gran Via
Circa Resort & Casino
 The Darling Gold Coast
 First Light Resort and Casino
 Galaxy Macau Phase II
 Grand Ho Tram Strip
 Imperial Pacific Resort and Hotel
 Jupiters Gold Coast
 NagaWorld Cambodia
 Naga 2 at NagaWorld Cambodia
Naga 3 at NagaWorld Cambodia
 The Playground in Atlantic City
 Resorts World Las Vegas
 Sands Macau
 Sochi Casino & Resort
 Solaire Resort & Casino
 Steel Pier
 Sunseeker Resort

Affiliated Companies 
 Shop12 - Lighting Design
 Marqi Branding Studio- Branding
 Competition Interactive - Skill-Based Casino Game Development

References 

1987 establishments in Nevada
Architecture firms based in Nevada
American companies established in 1987